The Deutsche Zeitschrift für Philosophie is a bimonthly academic journal of philosophy publishing in German. It was established in 1953.

See also 
 List of philosophy journals

External links 

Philosophy journals
Bimonthly journals
German-language journals
Publications established in 1953